In the religions of ancient Rome, an omen, plural omina, was a sign intimating the future, considered less important to the community than a prodigium but of great importance to the person who heard or saw it.

Omina could be good or bad. Unlike prodigies, bad omina were never expiated by public rites but could be reinterpreted, redirected or otherwise averted. Some time around 282 BC, a diplomatic insult formally "accepted as omen" was turned against Tarentum and helped justify its conquest. A thunderclap cost Marcellus his very brief consulship (215 BC): thereafter he traveled in an enclosed litter when on important business, to avoid seeing possible bad omens that might affect his plans. Bad omens could be more actively dealt with, by countersigns or spoken formulae. Before his campaign against Perseus of Macedon, the consul L Aemilius Paullus was said to have heard of the death of Perseus, his daughter's puppy. He interpreted this as a favourable omen and defeated King Perseus at the Battle of Pydna (168 BC).

Some evidently took omens very seriously, others did not, or failed to avert bad omens and were thought to have paid the ultimate price. In 217 BC, the consul Gaius Flaminius "disregarded his horse's collapse, the chickens, and yet other omens, before his disaster at Lake Trasimene". Licinius Crassus took ship for Syria despite the ominous call of a fig-seller – "Cauneas!" ("Caunean figs!"), which might be heard as "Cave ne eas!" ("Beware, don't go!") – and was killed on campaign. Cicero saw these events as merely coincidental; only the credulous could think them ominous. though by his time, politicians, military magnates and their supporters actively circulated tales of excellent omens that attended their births and careers.

In Roman histories and biographies, particularly Suetonius's Lives of the Caesars, the lives, personal character and destinies of various emperors can be read in reported portents, omens and dreams; the emperor Caligula, for example, dreamt that he stood before the throne of Jupiter, king of the gods, and Jupiter kicked him down from heaven to earth; Caligula ignored the premonition and was assassinated the next day.

See also
 Augur
 Auspice

Notes and references

Ancient Roman augury